The Cretto di Burri (crack of Burri) or Cretto di Gibellina (crack of Gibellina), also known as "Il Grande Cretto (The Great Crack)", is a landscape artwork undertaken by Alberto Burri in 1984 and left unfinished in 1989 (due to lack of funds), based on the old city of Gibellina. The original city of Gibellina was completely destroyed in the 1968 Belice earthquake. Gibellina has since been rebuilt, about 20 km from the city's original location.  In 2015, to mark what would have been Burri's one hundredth birthday, the work was finally completed.

The Cretto is also the subject of the theatrical show "I-TIGI a Gibellina" and its video transposition "I-TIGI Canto per Ustica" by the  Italian stage actor, theater director, dramaturge and author Marco Paolini.
Entirely shot inside the Cretto di Burri in the year 2000, it's the story of the DC9 ITAVIA that sank in the waters of Ustica in June 1980, and the reconstruction of the long investigation conducted by the Italian judge Rosario Priore.
The author declared that he choose the Cretto because "it is a sort of concrete labyrinth, which, seen from above, is similar to the maze of lies in which the judges had to orient themselves to find the thread of the investigation".

References

Italian art
Landscape art